Houston County Courthouse may refer to:

Houston County Courthouse (Alabama), Dothan, Alabama
Houston County Courthouse (Georgia), Perry, Georgia
Houston County Courthouse and Jail, Caledonia, Minnesota
Houston County Courthouse (Tennessee), Erin, Tennessee
Houston County Courthouse (Texas), Crockett, Texas, listed on the National Register of Historic Places